Agapios Tomboulis (Hagop Stambulyan) (1891–1965) was a famous Armenian and Greek oud player of rebetiko and Greek folk music, Armenian folk music, Turkish folk music, Jewish folk music born in Constantinople, he is known for being a well known associate of Roza Eskenazi.

Life and career

Early life
Hagop Stambulyan was born in 1891 in the Pera district of İstanbul to an Armenian father and a Greek mother.

Smyrna Trio

References

1891 births
1965 deaths
Greek folk musicians
Greek oud players
Armenian oud players
People from Constantinople vilayet
Greeks from the Ottoman Empire
Armenians from the Ottoman Empire
Constantinopolitan Greeks
People from Beyoğlu
Musicians from Istanbul
Emigrants from the Ottoman Empire to Greece